Ahmedabad Collectorate is administrative head office of Collector of Ahmedabad District in Ahmedabad City (District Headquarters). It is located near Regional Transport Office on Ashram Road. There are 11 Taluka, 554 Gram panchayat, 15 Nagar palika and 2 Nagar panchayat under Ahmedabad Collectorate. Current Collector of Ahmedabad is I.A.S Shri Dr. Dhavalkumar Patel.

References

External links
 Official site 

Ahmedabad district
Government of Ahmedabad